Aktuk (aka Yañapar, Яңапар) is a Mishar Tatar village in Krasnooktyabrsky District, Nizhny Novgorod Oblast. Most ancestors of Finnish Tatars were from Aktuk or neighboring villages.

History
The village is believed to be founded in 1600s by a Mishar Tatar named Aktuk. During those times, four other villages were established; Urazawıl, Atarawıl, Kızımawıl ja Kadımawıl. These five were possibly relatives one way or another.

Aktuk is said to have come from Tobolsk, which is consistent with the theory of G. Ahmarov, who thought that the Mishars in this area were partly formed by Asian nomads. The village culture has similarities with the Siberian Tatars. According to A. Orlov, a lot of "Meshchera Tatars" were in the Cossacks during Russian conquest of Siberia. Tradition tells that Uraz, the founder of Urazawıl (Urazovka) is connected to a Khan of Qasim Khanate. Atar is said to have come from Kadom.

The alternative name to Aktuk, Yañapar, means "New Par". It is believed that the predecessor to Aktuk might have been a Mordvin village named Par, though it is also the name of the village river.

Population 
According to 2002 census, 94% of the village's inhabitants were Tatars. In 2010, the number of inhabitants was 253.

Sources

External links 
 Aktuk on YouTube

Rural localities in Nizhny Novgorod Oblast
Krasnooktyabrsky District, Nizhny Novgorod Oblast
Finnish Tatars